Alen Ožbolt (born 24 June 1996) is a Slovenian professional footballer who plays as a forward for Hapoel Tel Aviv. He has been capped for Slovenia at all youth levels from under-16 to under-21.

Club career
Ožbolt began his career at Domžale and spent loan spell at Borussia Dortmund II, before joining Austrian club TSV Hartberg on a permanent basis in early 2018. However, he left Hartberg at the end of the 2017–18 season and joined Bulgarian club Lokomotiv Plovdiv as a free agent.

Lokomotiv Plovdiv
Ožbolt signed with Lokomotiv on 16 September 2018 on a three-year deal. Six days later, he made his debut in a 3–1 away league victory over Septemvri Sofia, replacing Bircent Karagaren in the 81st minute. On 15 May 2019, Ožbolt scored the winning goal in the 2019 Bulgarian Cup Final against Botev Plovdiv, which gave Lokomotiv their first Bulgarian Cup. He ended his debut season for Lokomotiv with 8 goals in 29 appearances in all competitions.

Slovan Bratislava
On 11 January 2020, Ožbolt joined Slovan Bratislava on a four-and-a-half-year contract.

Career statistics

Club

Honours

Club
Domžale
 Slovenian Cup: 2016–17

Lokomotiv Plovdiv
 Bulgarian Cup: 2018–19

Slovan Bratislava
Slovak Super Liga: 2019–20, 2020–21
Slovak Cup: 2019–20, 2020–21

Individual
Best goal in the Bulgarian First League: 2019

References

External links
 NZS profile 
 

1996 births
Living people
Sportspeople from Novo Mesto
Slovenian footballers
Slovenia youth international footballers
Slovenia under-21 international footballers
Association football forwards
NK Domžale players
Borussia Dortmund II players
TSV Hartberg players
PFC Lokomotiv Plovdiv players
ŠK Slovan Bratislava players
Hapoel Haifa F.C. players
Hapoel Tel Aviv F.C. players
Slovenian PrvaLiga players
Regionalliga players
2. Liga (Austria) players
First Professional Football League (Bulgaria) players
Slovak Super Liga players
2. Liga (Slovakia) players
Israeli Premier League players
Slovenian expatriate footballers
Expatriate footballers in Germany
Expatriate footballers in Austria
Expatriate footballers in Bulgaria
Expatriate footballers in Slovakia
Expatriate footballers in Israel
Slovenian expatriate sportspeople in Germany
Slovenian expatriate sportspeople in Austria
Slovenian expatriate sportspeople in Bulgaria
Slovenian expatriate sportspeople in Slovakia
Slovenian expatriate sportspeople in Israel